Antonio Beato (1835–1906), also known as Antoine Beato, was an Italian-British photographer. He is noted for his genre works, portraits, views of the architecture and landscapes of Egypt and other locations in the Mediterranean region. He was the younger brother of photographer Felice Beato (1832–1909), with whom he sometimes worked. Antonio and his brother were part of a small group of commercial photographers who were the first to produce images of the Orient on a large scale.

Life and work
Little is known of Antonio Beato's origins and early life. He was probably born in Venetian territory sometime after 1832, and later became a naturalised British citizen. His elder brother Felice Beato, at least, was born in Venice, but the family may have moved to Corfu, which had been a Venetian possession until 1814 when it was acquired by Britain. Antonio often used the French version of his given name, going by Antoine Beato. It is presumed that he did so because he mainly worked in Egypt, which had a large French-speaking population.

The existence of a number of photographs signed "Felice Antonio Beato" and "Felice A. Beato", led many scholars to assume that there was one photographer who somehow photographed at the same time in places as distant as Egypt and Japan. In 1983, it was shown that "Felice Antonio Beato" represented two brothers, Felice Beato and Antonio Beato, who regularly worked together, sharing a signature. The confusion arising from the signatures continues to cause problems in identifying which of the two photographers was the creator of any given image.

Virtually nothing is known about his training in photography. He may have become interested in photography through his brother, Felice, who is believed to have met the British photographer James Robertson in Malta in 1850, and purchased photographic equipment in Paris in around 1851, and later that year accompanied Robertson to Constantinople in 1851. Antonio joined his brother and Robertson in Malta in around 1853. A partnership, known as "Robertson & Beato" was formed in late 1853 or early 1854 in Pera, Constantinople. However, it is not entirely clear whether it was Antonio or Felice who was involved in the partnership. Some scholars believe that it was in fact, Antonio.

By the 1850s, tourist travel to Middle East created strong demand for photographs as souvenirs. Beato, and his brother were part of a group of early photographers who made their way to the East to capitalise on this demand. These pioneering photographers included Frenchmen, Félix Bonfils (1831-1885); Gustave Le Gray (1820-1884) and Hippolyte Arnoux, brothers Henri and Emile Bechard and the Greek Zangaki brothers, many of whom were in Egypt at the same time and entered into both formal and informal working partnerships. These early photographers, including Antonio and his brother, were among the first commercial photographers to produce images on a large scale in the Middle East.

In late 1854 or early 1855, the Beato brothers' sister, Leonilda Maria Matilda Beato, married her brothers' business partner, James Robertson. The couple had three daughters, Catherine Grace (b. 1856), Edith Marcon Vergence (b. 1859) and Helen Beatruc (b. 1861). A number of the firm's photographs produced in the 1850s are signed Robertson, Beato and Co. and it is believed that "and Co." refers to Antonio.

In July 1858 Antonio joined Felice in Calcutta. Felice had been in India since the beginning of the year photographing the aftermath of the Indian Rebellion of 1857. Antonio also photographed in India until December 1859 when he left Calcutta, probably for health reasons, and headed for Malta by way of Suez.

Antonio Beato went to Cairo towards the end 1859 or early 1860 and spent two years there before moving to Luxor where he opened a photographic studio in 1862 (until his death in 1906) and began producing tourist images of the people and architectural sites of the area. In the late 1860s, Antonio was in partnership with the French photographer, Hippolyte Arnoux. Beato's images of Egypt were distinctly different from those of other photographers working in the region. Whereas most photographers focussed on the grandeur of monuments and architecture, Beato concentrated on scenes of everyday life.

In 1864, at a time when his brother Felice was living and photographing in Japan, Antonio photographed members of Ikeda Nagaoki's Japanese mission who were visiting Egypt on their way to France.

Antonio Beato died in Luxor in 1906. His widow published a notice of his death while offering a house and equipment for sale.

A Freemason, he was member of a masonic Lodge in Beirut and later joined the Bulwer Lodge' Nr. 1068 in Cairo and was co-petitioner for the foundation of the Grecia Lodge Nr. 1105 in the Egyptian capital.

Collections (selection) 
Photographs by Antonio Beato are held in the following permanent collections:

 The Metropolitan Museum of Art, New York
 The Royal Collection, London
 J. Paul Getty Museum, Los Angeles
 Conway Library, The Courtauld Institute of Art, London
 Brooklyn Museum, New York
 American Academy in Rome, Rome
 Harvard Art Museums, Mass.
 National Gallery of Canada, Ottawa
 Art Institute of Chicago, Chicago
 Victoria and Albert Museum, London

See also
 History of photography
 List of Orientalist artists
 Orientalism

References

Further reading
 Antonio e Felice Beato (Venice: Ikona Photo Gallery, 1983).
 Bennett, Terry. Early Japanese Images (Rutland, Vermont: Charles E. Tuttle Company, 1996), 126, 143, pl. 118.
 Borcoman, James. Magicians of Light (Ottawa: The National Gallery of Canada, 1993), 82, 267.
 Clark, John. Japanese Exchanges in Art, 1850s to 1930s with Britain, continental Europe, and the USA: Papers and Research Materials (Sydney: Power Publications, 2001), 89–92, 115.
 The New York Public Library, s.v. "Beato, Antonio". Accessed 27 September 2006.
 The New York Public Library, "Louxor : Temple de Amenhophis, corte est". Accessed 27 September 2006.
 Osman, Colin. "Antonio Beato: Photographs of the Nile" History of Photography, vol. 14, no. 2 (April–June 1990), 101–110.
 Oztuncay, Bahattin. James Robertson: Pioneer Photography in the Ottoman Empire (Istanbul: Eran, 1992), 13, 25–26, 32.
 Perez, Nissan N. Focus East: Early Photography in the Near East, 1839–1885 (New York: Harry N. Abrams, Inc. 1988), 131, 127.
 Rosenblum, Naomi. A World History of Photography (New York: Abbeville Press, 1984), 121–122.
 Union List of Artists Names, s.v. "Beato, Antonio". Accessed 3 April 2006.
 Zannier, Italo. Verso oriente: Fotografie di Antonio e Felice Beato (Florence: Alinari, 1986).

External links 

 Work by Antonio Beato at the University of Michigan Museum of Art
 Work by Antonio Beato at the Getty Museum
 Work by Antonio Beato at the Metropolitan Museum of Art
 Work by Antonio Beato at the Cleveland Museum of Art
 Work by Antonio Beato at the Harvard Art Museums

1835 births
1906 deaths
19th-century Italian photographers
Architectural photographers
British Freemasons
20th-century Italian photographers
20th-century British male artists
20th-century Italian male artists
Orientalist painters
British portrait photographers
Photography in Egypt
Photography in Greece
Photography in India
Pioneers of photography
19th-century British photographers
19th-century British male artists
19th-century Italian male artists
Early photographers in Palestine
20th-century British photographers